Pure is a 2010 Swedish drama film directed and written by Lisa Langseth. Alicia Vikander's performance won the Guldbagge Award for Best Actress in a Leading Role at the 46th Guldbagge Awards.

Plot 
Twenty-year-old Katarina (Alicia Vikander) never finished school; she lives in Gothenburg with her alcoholic mother. Through a YouTube video, she is touched by the music of Wolfgang Amadeus Mozart. She applies for a receptionist job at the concert hall where she meets conductor Adam (Samuel Fröler).

Cast 
 Alicia Vikander as Katarina
 Samuel Fröler as Adam
 Martin Wallström as Mattias
 Josephine Bauer as Birgitta
 Helén Söderqvist Henriksson as personnel manager
 Kim Lantz as janitor 
 Frederik Nilsson as Henrik 
 Elisabeth Göransson as Agneta, social secretary 
 Ylva Gallon as nurse 
 Anna Åström as Cicci 
 Magnus Lindberg as Nille

References

External links 
 

2010 films
2010 drama films
Films directed by Lisa Langseth
Films with screenplays by Lisa Langseth
Swedish drama films
Films set in Gothenburg
2010s Swedish films